Arrah is a town in east-central Ivory Coast. It is a sub-prefecture of and the seat of Arrah Department in Moronou Region, Lacs District. Arrah is also a commune.

The tripoint of the districts of Lacs, Lagunes, and Comoé lies 20 kilometres east of the town.

In 2021, the population of the sub-prefecture of Arrah was 45,625.

Villages
The 8 villages of the sub-prefecture of Arrah and their population in 2014 are:
 Arrah (24 123)
 Assikro (977)
 Brou-Attakro (3 451)
 Dallosso (1 175)
 Etilékro (614)
 Kouadiokro (1 221)
 M'brakro (479)
 Yaffo-Agni (1 332)

References

Sub-prefectures of Moronou Region
Communes of Moronou Region